
Gmina Srokowo is a rural gmina (administrative district) in Kętrzyn County, Warmian-Masurian Voivodeship, in northern Poland, on the border with Russia.

Neighbouring gminas 

Gmina Srokowo is bordered by the gminas of Barciany, Kętrzyn and Węgorzewo. It also borders Russia (Kaliningrad oblast).

References 

 

Srokowo
Kętrzyn County

de:Srokowo#Gemeinde